Bryan Vincent Walsh was Lord Mayor of Brisbane, Australia from 1975 to 1976.

Career

Before being elected to the Brisbane City Council, Walsh was a schoolteacher. He joined the Ashgrove branch of the Labor Party in 1949.

In late 1974 Lord Mayor of Brisbane Clem Jones announced he would not stand in the upcoming election. After resigning the following year he was replaced by Walsh (who had been vice-mayor). Walsh served as Lord Mayor for nine months before losing his seat at the 1976 election.

References

Mayors and Lord Mayors of Brisbane
Australian Labor Party mayors
Year of birth missing (living people)
Living people